Bogdan Ilie (born 30 October 1999) is a Romanian professional footballer who plays as a defender for Liga I side Academica Clinceni.

References

External links
 
 Bogdan Ilie at lpf.ro

1999 births
Living people
Footballers from Bucharest
Romanian footballers
Association football defenders
Liga I players
Liga II players
LPS HD Clinceni players